Margaret Irwin may refer to:

Margaret Irwin (novelist) (1889–1967), English historical novelist
Margaret Irwin (trade unionist) (1858–1940), Scottish suffragist and labour activist